Erwin Knausmüller (1912 —  2000) was a Soviet stage and film actor of Austrian origin.

Biography
In 1932 he graduated from the Academy of Trade in Graz, Austria. He took part in anti-fascist activities. From 1936 he lived and worked in Moscow. Member of the  World War II in the ranks of the Soviet Army. Honored with Order of the Patriotic War 2nd Class.

He made his film debut in 1959 in the film by Ilya Gurin The Golden Eshelon. Knausmüller starred in 61 feature films in total.

Erwin Knausmüller died in Moscow on January 4, 2000. Buried in Moscow at the Vvedenskoye Cemetery.

Selected filmography
 The Golden Eshelon (1959) as Friedrich
 Farewell, Doves (1960) as episode
 Peace to Him Who Enters (1961) as german officer
 Judgment of the Mad (1961) as episode
 At Your Threshold (1962) as episode
 Hello, Children! (1962) as Professor Eisenach
 The Third Half (1962) as Major Heinz
 Attack and Retreat (1964) as German colonel
 War and Peace (1965-1967) as Franz von Weyrother
 Royal Regatta (1966) as rewarding man
 Anna Karenina (1967) as Vronsky's steward
 Woman's World (1967) as German corporal
 The Road to 'Saturn'  (1967) as German major
 The Secret Agent's Blunder  (1968) as Sebastian, Federal Intelligence Service agent
 Liberation (1968-1971) as German general
 Tchaikovsky (1969) as Countess von Mack's steward
 Secret Agent's Destiny (1970) as Sebastian
 The Saplings (1972) as American tourist
 Taming of the Fire (1972) as general
 No Return (1973) as episode
 The Flight of Mr. McKinley (1975) as company guest
 The Beginning of the Legend (1976) as German officer
 Front Beyond the Front Line (1977) as General Schwarzenberg
 Where Were You, Odysseus? (1978) as von Arvid
 TASS Is Authorized to Declare... (1984) as US ambassador to the USSR
 Battle of Moscow (1985) as German officer in Yasnaya Polyana
 To Award (Posthumously)  (1986) as  German officer
 Visit to Minotaur  (1987) as  Franz Colwood, Swiss businessman

References

External links
 

1912  births
2000 deaths
Soviet male film actors
Actors from Linz
Austrian emigrants to the Soviet Union
Burials at Vvedenskoye Cemetery
Soviet military personnel of World War II